{{DISPLAYTITLE:C15H23NO2S}}
The molecular formula C15H23NO2S (molar mass: 281.41 g/mol, exact mass: 281.1450 u) may refer to:

 OSU-6162 (PNU-96391)
 Pridopidine (PL-101)

Molecular formulas